The mass media in Qatar relays information and data in Qatar by means of television, radio, cinema, newspapers, magazines and the internet. Qatar has established itself as a leading regional figure in mass media over the past decade. Al Jazeera, a global news network which was established in 1996, has become the foundation of the media sector. The country uses media to brand itself and raise its international profile.

Despite Al Jazeera being considered to be one of the Middle East's most open media outlets, Qatari authorities enforce stringent restrictions on freedom of local media, including censoring internet services and outlawing criticism of the ruling family in the media.

Print media

Newspapers

There are currently seven newspapers in circulation in Qatar, four published in Arabic and three in English.  Qatar's first weekly newspaper, Gulf News, appeared in 1969. Al Arab was the first post-independence newspaper to appear in Qatar, in 1972. Gulf Times was the first English newspaper in Qatar until the arrival of The Peninsula in 1996.

According to circulation estimates released in 2004, Al Watan was the most widely circulated newspaper in Qatar, with a circulation rate of 18,000. Al Sharq and Gulf Times both came second, with circulation rates of 15,000. A 2008 report asserted that the total circulation rate was approximately 100,000 copies per day, with Al Raya and Gulf Times both having the highest circulation rates at 18,000, and Al Sharq and Al Watan having circulation rates of 15,000.

Magazines
Firefly Communications and Oryx Communications are two of the most prominent magazine publishing houses in Qatar. There were nine magazines in 2009.

The first weekly magazine, Al-Urooba, was issued in 1970.

English-language magazines in the country include family publication  Doha Family Magazine, the first regularly printed parenting publication in Qatar and Society, published by Gulf Times.

Business magazine The Edge, women's fashion magazine GLAM, and Qatar Today. Qatar Al Yom is an Arabic-language business magazine. By 2014, Firefly had added more publications to its brand, including Qatar Construction News, Alef, Volante and Sur La Terre.

Publishing
Qatar established a foothold in the publications market with the founding of Bloomsbury Qatar Foundation Publishing in 2008. Qatar Foundation ceased its partnership with Bloomsbury Publishing in 2015, and created its own publishing house in its place under the name Hamad Bin Khalifa University Press. Another Qatari book publisher, Katara Publishing House, was established in 2018.

Qatar also holds annual book fairs to celebrate the new publications produced by the local publication companies. In the 30th annual Qatari International Book Fair there was a number of publishing companies that participated. Lusail Publishing House, Roza Publishing House are some of the new additions to the publication companies.

Radio
All radio programs from Qatar are state-owned and are amalgamated as the Qatar Broadcasting Service. Since 2017, there had been four new radio stations that had been launched. Radio broadcasting in the country began from 25 June 1968 on Qatar Radio. English transmissions started in December 1971, first appearing on Qatar Radio for roughly an hour a day started in December 1971 in an effort to accommodate the increasing non-Arabic speaking expat community. Qatar Radio currently features radio stations in English, Arabic, French and Urdu. According to the Director of broadcasting, the aim of having radio stations in different languages is to try and diversify the media content aimed at the residents in Qatar.

Television

The first television station in Qatar was Qatar TV. It began producing and transmitting its own programmes in 1970, with color transmission since 1974. It had a monopoly on television audience until 1993, when Qatar Cablevision began broadcasting satellite channels. Despite the broadening of television offerings, Qatar TV remains popular amongst locals. The first news network was the Qatar News Agency, which was launched in 1975. In May 1977, the Qatar General Broadcasting and Television Corporation was founded.

Al Jazeera, currently Qatar's largest television network, was founded in 1996. Initially launched as an Arabic news and current affairs satellite TV channel, Al Jazeera has since expanded into a network with several outlets, including the internet and specialty TV channels in multiple languages. It is accessible in several world regions. The network is a Private Foundation for Public Benefit under Qatari law, receiving its funding from the Qatari government but operating independently.

beIN Sports, a global network of sports channels, was launched in 2012. It is an affiliate of Al Jazeera Media Network. It currently operates three channels in France – beIN Sport 1, beIN Sport 2 and beIN Sport MAX – and launched two channels in the United States in August 2012.

During the 2011 AFC Asian Cup, the Al-Kass Sports Channel set a world record when it deployed 51 different cameras in a broadcast of a single match.

Motion pictures
Qatar's modern film industry was conceived in 2009. From then onwards, there have been efforts to develop a sustainable film industry in the country and in the region, such as the organization and hosting of the Doha Tribeca Film Festival from 2009 to 2012, which formed a partnership with the American-based Tribeca Film Festival.

In 2010, Khalifa al-Muraikhi released Qatar's first full-length film, Clockwise. The film is a documentary on 'fijri', a genre of Arabic music performed during pearl trips, and was premiered in Doha during the celebration ceremony for the city's successful nomination for the 'Arab Capital of Culture'.

The Doha Film Institute was launched in 2010 with the aim of developing a film industry with strong links to the international film community. DFI is credited as a production company on several films, including the co-production of Black Gold; The Reluctant Fundamentalist, directed by Mira Nair, which was the opening film in the 69th Venice International Film Festival; and Kanye West's Cruel Summer, a short film shot in Doha which premiered during the 2012 Cannes Film Festival.

Innovations Films have been credited by the DFI as being one of the leading film production companies in the country.

Some observers in the Arab art scene have criticized the Qatari film industry, claiming that they feature more foreign films than regional ones, and view it as more of a platform to put the country's film industry on the map rather than a means to support regional talents.

Internet

Internet services have been available in Qatar since 1997. Statistics released by the International Telecommunication Union reveal that as of 2012, 88% of the population is connected to the internet. Internet usage has drastically increased from 2000, when it was 5%. All of the major newspaper publications have online websites. Al Jazeera's English website was launched in 2003 at the beginning of the Iraq War. It has been the subject of numerous cyber attacks. The Facebook page for global-facing media outlet AJ+ has obtained over ten million 'likes' as of April 2018.

In 2007 Qatar was the second most connected country in the Arab region. Qatar's internet penetration rate grew from 6% in 2001 to 37% in 2007 to 86% in 2011. From 2013 until 2016, internet penetration in Qatar grew 12%, leaving it at 93%.

In regards to telecommunication infrastructure, Qatar is the highest ranked Middle Eastern country in the World Economic Forum's Network Readiness Index (NRI), an indicator for determining the development level of a country's information and communication technologies. Qatar ranked number 23 overall in the 2014 NRI ranking, unchanged from 2013.

Media censorship

Prior to 1995, there were severe restrictions in regards to the disposition of information that journalists were permitted to report. The censorship of local media was formally lifted after Sheikh Hamad bin Khalifa Al Thani deposed his father in July 1995, when a few weeks after the deposition,  he withdrew censors from local newspapers. Further restrictions were lifted in 1996 when he abolished the information ministry and its censorship office. The information ministry was later replaced with a government-owned corporation.

The 1979 Prints and Publications Law, which imposes many restrictions on the freedom of the press, remained in effect despite the other reforms made by Sheikh Hamad. Article 46 of the press law outlaws criticism of the Emir. It declares, “The Emir of the state of Qatar shall not be criticized and no statement can be attributed to him unless under a written permission from the manager of his office.” As a result, journalists practice self-censorship, particularly in regards to the ruling family. They are also subject to prosecution for insulting Islam. IREX reports that newspapers and radio programmes possess a wider margin of freedom than the official news media.

Internet service is monitored by the government, which censors pornography and other materials deemed inappropriate. The customs and the censorship office in the Qatar General Broadcasting and Television Corporation monitor imported foreign broadcasting for sensitive content.

In 2014, a Cybercrime Prevention Law was passed, threatening to punish anyone who violates social values by publishing information regarding the private or family life of an individual, even if the information is accurate. If convicted, a perpetrator can face up to a year in prison and a fine of QR 100,000. The law also stipulates that anyone found guilty of publishing false news which could jeopardize the safety of the state could face a maximum 1-year prison sentence and QR 250,000 fine, while anyone who is found guilty of publishing false news with the aim of destabilizing national security may face up to a three-year prison sentence and a fine of QR 500,000. The Gulf Center for Human Rights has stated that the law is a threat to freedom of speech and has called for certain articles of the law to be revoked.

Initiatives to alleviate media censorship
In 2008, Qatar was the only country which abstained from signing the Arab Satellite Charter, a proposal intended to regulate and control satellite TV stations. AFP reported that Qatar abstained from signing the charter due to legal reasons.

The Doha Centre for Media Freedom was established in December 2007 with the aim of promoting media freedom throughout the region. Robert Ménard, a founder of Reporters Without Borders, was appointed as the director-general of the organization in April 2008. He resigned in July 2009 over a dispute with the Qatari authorities, whom he accuses of restricting the centre's freedom of speech.

See also
Al Jazeera effect

References

 
Qatar
Qatar